Troy Peak is the highest mountain in the Grant Range in northeastern Nye County, Nevada, United States. It is the thirty-sixth highest mountain in Nevada. Troy Peak also ranks as the third-most topographically prominent peak in Nye County and the fourteenth-most prominent peak in the state.

References

External links 
 
 

Mountains of Nevada
Humboldt–Toiyabe National Forest
Mountains of Nye County, Nevada